Diedra calocedrana is a species of moth of the family Tortricidae. It is found in the United States, where it has been recorded from California.

The moth is about 20 mm. Adults have been recorded on wing in July and August.

References

Moths described in 1999
Archipini